Hydrophis fasciatus, commonly known as the striped sea snake, is a species of venomous sea snake in the family Elapidae (Hydrophiinae).

Description
Hydrophis fasciatus has a small head, long body and is slender anteriorly. The scales on thickest part of body are subquadrangular or hexagonal in shape, juxtaposed or slightly imbricate. It has 5-6 maxillary (upper jaw bone) teeth behind fangs and 2 anterior temporals.

Body scales in 28-33 rows around the neck, 47-58 around midbody (increase in number of rows from neck to midbody 20–27); ventral scales 414-514 (average 460).

Anterior part of body including head and neck dark olive to black with pale oval yellowish spots on sides, sometimes connected as crossbars; posterior, grayish; below whitish; dark rhomboidal spots may extend down the sides of the body and form complete annuli in young.

Total length males 1100 mm, females 990 mm; tail length males 100 mm, females 75 mm.

Distribution
 Indian Ocean (coasts of Bangladesh, Pakistan, India, Myanmar, Thailand, Malaysia).
 Coasts of Indonesia (Sumatra, Java, Borneo).
 Coasts of Australia, Philippines, New Guinea.
 Coasts of Guangxi, Guangdong, Hainan, Fujian (China).

References

Further reading
 Bergman, R. A. M. 1962 The anatomy of Hydrophis fasciatus atriceps. Biol. Jaarb. 30: 389-416
 Schneider, J.G. 1799. Historiae Amphibiorum naturalis et literariae Fasciculus Primus continens Ranas, Calamitas, Bufones, Salamandras et Hydros in genera et species descriptos notisque suis distinctos. Jena. 266 pp. (Hydrus fasciatus, pp. 233–238, 240–241.).
 The IUCN Red List of Threatened Species(tm)(http://oldredlist.iucnredlist.org/details/176744/0).

fasciatus
Reptiles of Pakistan
Reptiles described in 1799
Snakes of Australia